Francesco Daniele Quinn (March 22, 1963 – August 5, 2011) was an Italian-born American actor. The first son of Oscar-winner Anthony Quinn and Iolanda Addolori (Anthony Quinn's second wife), Francesco is perhaps best known for his breakout role as Rhah in Oliver Stone’s Academy Award-winning Platoon (1986). However, his first major role in television was in the 1985 prime-time television miniseries Quo Vadis?. His final role was the voice of the Autobot Dino (Mirage) in Transformers: Dark of the Moon.

Early years
Francesco Quinn was born in Rome, Italy, the son of Anthony Quinn and second wife Iolanda Addolori, a noted costume designer to whom Anthony Quinn was married for 31 years. Quinn had Mexican, Irish, and Italian ancestry.

Career

Film 
Quinn appeared in many feature films including the New York Independent Film Festival winner Placebo Effect. He acted with his father in several films, including A Star For Two with Lauren Bacall. The two Quinns also had the opportunity to share the role of Santiago in the 1990 mini-series The Old Man and the Sea, son and father playing the character as a young and old man.

Quinn sometimes played moody, dangerous characters, such as vampire Vlad Tepes in the 2003 direct to video alt-historical thriller Vlad, and wandering warrior Thane Le Mal in the short film The Gnostic. Like his father, Quinn also appeared in historical dramas, playing such roles as Latino Captain Salamanca in Steven Spielberg’s mini-series Into the West (2005) and a lead role in TNT's Rough Riders (1997) (TV). One of Quinn's earliest roles was as Marcus Vinicius in the 1985 mini-series Quo Vadis?, co-starring with some major film actors of the 1980s.

Later examples of Quinn's work included Park, which won the audience award at 2007 CineVegas, and the short film Muertas, starring America Ferrera. In 2007, he appeared as Ruben Vega in the Academy Award-nominated short film The Tonto Woman, adapted from the Elmore Leonard short story.

Television 
From 1999 to 2001, Francesco appeared on the CBS soap opera The Young and the Restless as Nina Webster's boyfriend, Tomas del Cerro, and was nominated for an ALMA Award (an award reserved for Latino/a performers) as Outstanding Actor in a Daytime Soap Opera for his work as Tomas Del Cerro, an aloof writer from New York.

Quinn also appeared extensively in television guest-star roles in crime and thriller dramas. He was lead guest star in an episode of JAG (1995). On CBS's The Fugitive, Quinn played Victor Gutierrez, a DEA agent with an edge, and played the recurring role of Islamic terrorist Syed Ali on Fox's series 24. Other TV guest starring roles occurred in Criminal Minds, ER, CSI: Miami, The Glades, Navy NCIS, Alias, Crossing Jordan, In the Heat of the Night, Miami Vice, Red Shoe Diaries, The Handler, Soldier of Fortune, Good vs. Evil, Vengeance Unlimited, and The Adventures of Young Indiana Jones.  Quinn also portrayed the final criminal/villain, Guillermo Beltran, in the long-running F/X series, The Shield.  In 2008, Quinn joined Luke Perry and C. Thomas Howell in the western film A Gunfighter's Pledge.

Quinn was one of the earlier working actors to branch out into contributing to video games with his role as a main character in Command & Conquer: Tiberian Sun (1999). In 2010–2011, he took part in the second season of the Italian TV series Il commissario Manara.

Personal life
Francesco married Julie McCann and had two children; Massimiliano and Michela Quinn. The marriage ended in divorce in 2008. Before his death he was dating Valentina Castellani.

Quinn has two siblings: Danny Quinn, Lorenzo Quinn.
Quinn has eight other surviving half siblings: Alex, Antonia, Catalina, Christina, Danny, Duncan, Ryan, Sean, and Valentina Quinn. His eldest sibling, Christopher, drowned in 1941, aged two.

Athletic pursuits
Quinn pursued sports such as skiing, snowboarding, windsurfing, free diving, road cycling, mountain biking, and actively raced motocross and street bikes. Quinn also was an avid motorcycler, and was a spokesman for The Motorcycle Industry Council and Honda. He was fluent in English, French, Spanish and Italian.

Quinn was a contestant on Ty Murray’s Celebrity Bull Riding Challenge on CMT, until he was sidelined with a broken rib after being stomped on by a Level 2 bull.

Death
Quinn died on August 5, 2011, in Malibu, California after experiencing what was believed to be a heart attack while running up a street with his children near his home.

Filmography

Film

Television

References

External links
 
 QuickTime-viewable copy of Francesco Quinn as The Gnostic
 L.A. Times article "Quinn Begins Again" on Oscar-nominated The Tonto Woman

1963 births
2011 deaths
20th-century American male actors
21st-century American male actors
Male actors from Rome
American male film actors
American male soap opera actors
American male television actors
American male voice actors
People of Lazian descent
Italian expatriates in the United States
Italian male film actors
Italian male television actors
American people of Irish descent
American people of Italian descent
American people of Mexican descent
Italian people of Irish descent
Italian people of Mexican descent